Meliosma simplicifolia is a species of plant in the family Sabiaceae. It is widely distributed in Asia from India through south-east Asia.

Gallery

References

simplicifolia